Equatorial College School, also known as ECS, is a private secondary school in the Ibanda District of Uganda. It was founded by a group of professionally skilled teachers in 2002 under the board of Directors headed by Robert Kamasaka, and the current Headmaster is Bigirwa Moses. It maintains strong links with its sister school, University College School in London, from which it receives funds, resources and a steady stream of gap year students. It also has links with Kingston University. 

The ECS is a mixed school where the pupils are aged 13-19 and it has a total of 470 students. The school teaches traditional subjects, such as maths, English and science and pupils who attend here, achieve some of the highest exam results in the region. Here, girls are given equal opportunities to the boys. 

Fees are between £150 a year which includes daily meals, and if boarding is required, these fees are doubled.

Regular trips to Uganda are made by students and teachers from University College School.

References 

Schools in Uganda
Educational institutions established in 2002
Ibanda District
2002 establishments in Uganda